Aaron Belkin (born March 12, 1966) is a political scientist, researcher and professor. He currently teaches political science at San Francisco State University and is the director of the Palm Center, a think tank that commissions and disseminates research on gender, sexuality and the military.

In 2011, he was a grand marshal in San Francisco's LGBT Pride Parade.

Education 
Belkin received his bachelor's degree from Brown University in international relations in 1988. He then went to the University of California Berkeley where he got a master's and PhD in political science. He is a graduate of Hawken School in Gates Mills, Ohio, where he was the friend and prom date of LGBT activist Roberta A. Kaplan.

Career

Academia 
Belkin taught as an associate professor at University of California Santa Barbara from 1998 to 2009, while also teaching psychology at Hunter College between 2005 and 2006. While at Santa Barbara, he became the founding director of one of 14 original research centers at the Institute for Social, Behavioral, and Economic Research at UCSB. This center was eventually renamed the Palm Center in memory of Michael D. Palm and remained closely connected to the UC system even after it became an independent non-profit.

Activism 
At the Palm Center, Belkin has focused on new ways for social science research to convince public opinion. Most notably, he turned this attention to the campaign to repeal the military's don't ask, don't tell, or "DADT" policy. His 2011 book How We Won outlines these strategies and shows how building public support to end DADT in turn, made it an issue that politicians had to spend less political capital to address.
Belkin claimed that the research and evidence always indicated that ending DADT would not in any way destabilize the military, but building a critical mass of public and political support took over a decade of focused action.

After the success of the campaign to repeal DADT, he tuned his attention to engaging in a national policy conversation on "military service by transgender personnel".

Research/writing 
In addition to his books, Belkin regularly blogs for the Huffington Post.

Publications 
 Bring Me Men: Military Masculinity and the Benign Façade of American Empire, 1898–2001. New York, NY: Columbia University Press, 2012; Oxford University Press, 2013. . .
 How We Won: Progressive Lessons from the Repeal of “Don’t Ask, Don’t Tell". New York, NY: Huffington Post Media Group, 2011. E-book. .
 United We Stand? Divide and Conquer Politics and the Logic of International Hostility. Albany, NY: State University of New York Press, 2005. . .
 Don’t Ask, Don’t Tell: Exploring the Debates on the Gay Ban in the U.S. Military, co-edited with Geoffrey Bateman. Boulder CO: Lynne Rienner Publishers, 2003. . 
 Counterfactual Thought Experiments in World Politics: Logical, Methodological, and Psychological Perspectives, co-edited with Philip E. Tetlock. Princeton NJ: Princeton University Press, 1996. .

References

External links

1966 births
Living people
American political scientists
San Francisco State University faculty
American LGBT rights activists
Activists from California
LGBT people from Ohio
University of California, Santa Barbara faculty
Brown University alumni
UC Berkeley College of Letters and Science alumni
21st-century American LGBT people